Revolutionary Anticapitalist Left (IZAR) is a Trotskyist political party in Spain.

History
IZAR was founded by a split of Anticapitalistas, after some members of that organization were expelled for being critical with Podemos. in the 2016 general elections IZAR won 854 votes in the three districts were they run: 143 in Almería (0.05%), 456 in Málaga (0.06%) and 255 in Granada (0.05%). The party had a city councilor in Burgos (elected within the Imagina Burgos list) between 2015 and 2019.

External links
IZAR web site (in Spanish)

References

Communist parties in Spain
Far-left politics in Spain
Fourth International (post-reunification)
Trotskyist organisations in Spain